The , commonly known as , is the largest national trade union center in Japan, with over six million members as of 2011. It was founded in 1989 as a result of the merger of the Japan Confederation of Labor (Domei), the Federation of Independent Unions (Churitsuroren) and the National Federation Of Industrial Organisations (Shinsambetsu). In 1990, the General Council of Trade Unions of Japan (Sohyo) also joined RENGO.

As of July 2012, RENGO has 54 affiliate unions and 47 local organizations.

Party affiliation

RENGO was historically affiliated with the Democratic Party of Japan, but on June 28, 2012, president Nobuaki Koga made a speech at the Liberal Democratic Party headquarters stating that the confederation may reconsider its future.
In 2014, it endorsed LDP-supported candidate Yoichi Masuzoe for the Tokyo gubernatorial election.

Affiliated organizations

Current affiliates

Many unions are affiliated with RENGO:

Observer affiliate:
 DOKIRO Hokkaido Seasonal Workers' Union (2,660 members as of 2009)

Friendly affiliate:
 NIKKENKYO Council of Japan Construction Industry Employee's Unions (35,624 members as of 2009)

Former affiliates

Local organizations
RENGO also has local organizations for each of Japan's 47 prefectures.

Leadership

General Secretaries
Seigo Yamada (1989–1993)
Etsuya Washio (1993–1997)
Kiyoshi Sasamori (1997–2001)
Hiroyuki Nagumo (2001–2013)
Rikio Kozu (2013–2015)
Naoto Omi (2015–2017)
Yasunobu Aihara (2017–2021)
Hideyuki Shimizu (2021—Present)

Presidents
Akira Yamagishi (1989–1995)
Jinnosuke Ashida (1995–1997)
Etsuya Washio (1997–2001)
Kiyoshi Sasamori (2001–2005)
Tsuyoshi Takagi (2005–2009)
Nobuaki Koga (2009–2015)
Rikio Kozu (2015–2021)
Tomoko Yoshino (2021—Present)

See also

 Labor unions in Japan

References

Sources
 Rengo website

External links
  Japanese Trade Union Confederation

National trade union centers of Japan
International Trade Union Confederation
Trade Union Advisory Committee to the OECD
Trade unions established in 1989